The Hit is a South Korean music program starring Song Eun-i and Kim Shin-Young as the MCs. The show aired on KBS2 from February 8 to April 19, 2019. It is distributed and syndicated by KBS every Friday at 20:00 (KST). The program also aired on KBS World with English subtitles.

Synopsis 
This is a music show where 2 different artists or groups come together to make a music shuffle that mashes up each of their hit songs that they selected to make it an even greater hit song. The groups which manage to hit 10K hearts from the audience before the performance ends are able to receive the "Golden Record Disc" on which they then sign. The "Golden Record Disc" is then displayed at the recording studio itself.

Airdate

Cast

List of Episodes

Ratings 

 Ratings listed below are the individual corner ratings of The Hit. (Note: Individual corner ratings do not include commercial time, which regular ratings include.)

References

External links 
 Official Website 
 

Korean Broadcasting System
South Korean variety television shows
South Korean television shows
Korean-language television shows
2019 South Korean television series debuts
2019 South Korean television series endings
Pages with unreviewed translations